Isum is a surname. Notable people with the surname include:

John Isum (1680?–1726), English composer and organist
Rachel Robinson (née Isum, born 1922), professor, nurse, and widow of Jackie Robinson

See also
Åsum (disambiguation)